See also :Category:People from Newport, Wales
This entry lists notable people who were born, lived or worked in Newport (Newportonians).

Arts, literature and media

 Keith Baxter (actor)
 Alison Bielski (poet)
 Joyce Bland (actress)
 Rev Augustus Buckland (writer)
 James Coombes (actor)
 Jack Crabtree (contemporary British artist)
 Charles Danby, actor
 Josie d'Arby (actress and television presenter)
 Gareth David-Lloyd (actor)
 W. H. Davies (poet, tramp)
 Dirty Sanchez (actors based in Newport)
 Aimee-Ffion Edwards (actress)
 Adrian Finighan (newsreader reporter and journalist)
 Valerie Gearon (actress)
 Peter Greenaway CBE (film director)
 Fred Hando (writer, artist and schoolteacher)
 Lyn Harding (actor)
 Anne Hegerty (TV celebrity, South Wales Argus journalist 1980s)
 Frederick William Horner (playwright, publisher and politician)
 Colin Jeavons (actor)
 Charles William King (writer)
 David Langford (author)
 Roger Lewis (academic)
 Desmond Llewelyn (actor; James Bond movies)
 Bernard Lloyd (actor; BBC's The Signal-Man)
 Arthur Machen (author)
 Johnny Morris OBE (presenter, BBC's Animal Magic)
 Darragh Mortell (actor)
 Matt Rees (novelist)
 Julian Richards (film director)
 Rex Richards (actor, rugby player)
 Nathan Rogers (writer)
 Keiron Self (actor)
 Banita Sandhu (actress)
 Caroline Sheen (actress)
 Michael Sheen OBE (actor)
 Leslie Thomas OBE (author)
 Tayce (drag artist)

Music

 60ft Dolls (1990s rock trio)
 The Darling Buds (indie band)
 Desecration (death metal band)
 Dub War (rock band)
 Nick Evans (trombonist notable in the Canterbury Scene)
 Goldie Lookin' Chain (satirical rap group)
 Holly Holyoake (soprano)
 Gerard Johnson (keyboard player with Saint Etienne)
 Mai Jones (songwriter, entertainer and radio producer)
 Jack Perrett (singer, songwriter, and musician)
 Jon Langford (musician)
 Jon Lee (drummer with Feeder)
 Jon Lilygreen (Eurovision 2010 contestant and singer with pop duo Lilygreen & Maguire)
 Maggot (rapper with Goldie Lookin Chain)
 Donna Matthews (lead guitarist with Elastica)
 Grant Nicholas (lead singer with Feeder)
 Nigel Pulsford (original lead guitarist with Bush)
 Ray Ennis (guitarist with Racing Cars and Swingin' Blue Jeans)
 Skindred (reggae metal band)
 Joe Strummer (guitarist with The Clash), lived in Newport for a year 1973–1974
 Terris (indie band)
 John Rogers Thomas (singer, pianist and composer 1829–1896)

Politics

 Kenneth Baker, Baron Baker of Dorking 
 John Batchelor (also anti-slavery campaigner)
 Jayne Bryant
 Dame Rosemary Butler
 David TC Davies
 Joseph Davies
 Chris Elmore 
 Paul Flynn former Newport West MP
 John Frost (Chartist and Mayor of Newport)
 Charles Gibbs (Canadian politician)
 John Griffiths 
 Roy Hughes, Baron Islwyn of Casnewydd 
 Ruth Jones
 Giles Morgan
 William Morgan
 William Pritchard Morgan ('The Welsh Gold King' and Liberal MP for Merthyr Tydfil 1888–1900)
 Thomas Phillips Mayor of Newport during the Chartist Uprisng
 John Savage OC (politician; Premier of Nova Scotia)
 Frank Soskice, Baron Stow Hill
 James Henry Thomas
 Godfrey Morgan, 1st Viscount Tredegar (Member of Parliament, landowner and philanthropist)
 Florence Tunks (suffragette)
 Sir Charles Hanbury Williams (diplomat and satirist)

Sport

Football

 Mark Aizlewood
 Steve Aizlewood
 Byron Anthony
 Cliff Birch
 Nathan Blake
 Stan Bowsher
 Ryan Broom
 Roy Clarke
 Graham Coldrick
 Aaron Collins
 James Collins
 Lewis Collins
 Ellie Curson (born)
 Albert Derrick
 Christian Doidge
 Redvern Edmunds
 Jack Edwards
 Lee Evans
 Owen Evans
 Michael Flynn
 Roger Freestone
 Riccardo Gabbiadini
 Albert Groves
 Chris Gunter
 Ellis Harrison
 Ryan Hillier
 Harold Jenkins
 Darren Jones
 Lee Kendall
 Jack Lewis
 Sonny Lewis
 Steve Lowndes
 Billy Lucas
 Peter Nicholas
 Howard Passadoro
 Chris Pearce
 Charlie Phillips
 Arthur Pritchard
 Keith Pring
 Tony Pulis
 Graham Rathbone
 John Relish
 James Rowberry
 Billy Shergold
 Derrick Sullivan
 Martyn Sprague
 Jeff Thomas
 Barrie Vassallo
 Erin Vaughan
 Nigel Vaughan
 Bill Waite
 Arthur Weare
 Len Weare
 Andy White
 Rhys Wilmot
 James Wilson
 Finlay Wood
 Albert Young
 George Young

Rugby

 George Andrews
 Len Attewell
 Mel Baker
 Stuart Barnes
 Taine Basham
 Fred Birt
 George Boots
 Leon Brown
 Nathan Budgett
 David Burcher
 Eddie Butler
 Glyn Davidge
 Harold Davies
 Harry Day
 Elliot Dee
 Gareth Evans
 John Evans
 Charlie Faulkner
 Trevor Foster
 Billy Geen
 Arthur 'Monkey' Gould
 Bert Gould
 Bob Gould
 Cerys Hale
 Keith Jarrett
 Ceri Jones
 Ryan Jones
 Thomas Baker Jones
 Llewellyn Lloyd
 Horace Lyne
 Ossie Male
 Gus Merry
 Tyler Morgan
 Jack Morley
 Steve Morris
 Richard Mullock
 Lyndon Mustoe
 Charlie Newman
 Alix Popham
 Harry Peacock
 Lou Phillips
 Reg Plummer
 Charlie Pritchard
 Rex Richards
 Jamie Roberts
 Jerry Shea
 Reg Skrimshire
 Jeff Squire
 George Thomas
 Malcolm Thomas
 Bunner Travers
 George Travers
 Tommy Vile
 Aaron Wainwright
 Alex Walker
 Nick Walne
 Matthew J Watkins
 Stuart Watkins
 Jack Wetter
 Jack Whitfield
 Stanley Williams
 Bobby Windsor
 Chris Wyatt

Other sports

 Johnny Basham (boxer)
 Mark Bennett (snooker player)
 Darren Campbell (athlete; Olympic gold medal-winning sprinter)
 Dan Cherry (cricketer)
 Paul Collier (snooker referee)
 Matthew Compton (cricketer)
 Abbas Farid (freestyle footballer)
 Adam Harrison (cricketer)
 Venissa Head (athlete; shot putter and discus thrower)
 Robert Henderson (cricketer)
 Len Hill (footballer and cricketer)
 Gary Hocking (motorcycle racer)
 Christian Malcolm (athlete; Olympic sprinter)
 Sean McGoldrick (bantamweight boxer)
 Darren Morgan (snooker player)
 Jon Mould (racing cyclist)
 Andrew Pagett (snooker player)
 David 'Bomber' Pearce (heavyweight boxer)
 Reginald Phillips (cricketer)
 Phillip Price (golfer)
 Alan Rees (Grand Prix motor racing driver)
 Dick Richardson (heavyweight boxer)
 Tony Ridler (darts player)
 Sallyanne Short (athlete)
 Ian Preece (snooker player)

Other notable people 
Caerwyn Clement, Owner of Ashby's (businessman and all around great person)

 Sir John Beynon, 1st Baronet CBE (businessman and military commander)
 Perce Blackborow (Antarctic explorer)
 Cadoc (saint)
 Lee Dainton, star of MTV's Dirty Sanchez
 Lewis Evans (mathematician)
 Gwladys (queen: wife of King Gwynllyw)
 Gwynllyw (saint)
 Mary Jane Innes (brewery manager)
 Sarah Lang (game show contestant)
 Tom 'Toya' Lewis Albert Medal (Newport Docks disaster 2 July 1909)
 Edward Lewis (minister)
 John Wallace Linton VC (Royal Navy Commander)
 Sir Terry Matthews OBE (entrepreneur; Wales' first billionaire)
 Raymond Steed (seaman)
 Ruth van Heyningen (biochemist)
 Jack Williams (VC) (Company Sergeant Major, South Wales Borderers), died in Newport 1953

 
Newport
New
people